Raúl Chávez de la Rosa (4 March 1939 – 4 November 2010) was a Mexican footballer. He competed in the men's tournament at the 1964 Summer Olympics.

References

External links
 

1939 births
2010 deaths
Mexican footballers
Mexico international footballers
Olympic footballers of Mexico
Footballers at the 1964 Summer Olympics
Place of birth missing
Association football forwards
C.F. Monterrey players